The Jewish Tribune can refer to:

The Jewish Tribune (Canada)
Jewish Tribune (UK)